Jesús Gabriel "Jessie" Magdaleno (born November 8, 1991) is an American professional boxer who held the WBO junior featherweight title from 2016 to 2018. He is the younger brother of boxer Diego Magdaleno.

Amateur career
Magdaleno was one of the best amateur fighters in America, finishing his amateur career with a 120-16 record. In 2009 Magdaleno won both the United States National Championship by beating Rau'shee Warren and won the National Golden Gloves Championship by beating Antonio Nieves (among others) in the Bantamweight division.

Professional career
Magdaleno is signed to Bob Arum's Top Rank.

On June 6, 2012, Magdaleno knocked out Puerto Rican veteran Carlos Valcárcel in the first round. The bout was televised on ESPN's Friday Night Fights.

On 5 November, 2016, Magdaleno faced Nonito Donaire in his first ever bid to win a world title. The fight was close and very entertaining, but the judges saw Magdaleno as the clear winner, scoring the fight 118-110, 116-112 and 116-112 in favor of the challenger and newly crowned WBO junior featherweight champion.

In his first title defense, Magdaleno managed to make easy work out of challenger Adeilson Dos Santos. Midway through the second round, Magdaleno managed to drop Dos Santos. Dos Santos beat the count, but Magdaleno threw a flurry of shots to drop him again. This was enough for the referee to stop the fight at 2:51.

In his next fight, he faced the young talented fighter from Ghana, Isaac Dogboe. Magdaleno started off strong, dropping Dogboe in the opening round. Dogboe managed to recover and the fight went on. In the fifth round, Dogboe returned the favor and dropped Magdaleno with a heavy right hand. The champion was visibly hurt, and even though he managed to continue the fight, Dogboe was clearly winning the fight. In the 11th round, Dogboe would drop Magdaleno two more times, forcing the referee to stop the fight.

After his first professional loss, Magdaleno fought and defeated former world titlist Rico Ramos.

On 17 August, 2019, Magdaleno faced Rafael Riviera. In an entertaining fight, Magdaleno managed to first drop Riviera at the beginning of the ninth round. In the same round, an accidental elbow by Riviera caused a bad cut over Magdaleno's right eye. The ringside physician ruled that the cut was too severe for the fight to continue. Magdaleno was awarded a technical decision win.

On June 11, 2020, Magdaleno fought Dominican fighter Yenifel Vicente. Magdaleno had his way with his opponent, dropping him twice, once in the first, and once in the fifth round. Vicente also lost four points for his low blows on Magdaleno. When Vicente went for another low blow in the tenth round, the referee had seen enough of it, and stopped the fight, awarding Magdaleno a DQ win.

Professional boxing record

See also
Notable boxing families
List of Mexican boxing world champions
List of world super-bantamweight boxing champions

References

External links

Jessie Magdaleno - Profile, News Archive & Current Rankings at Box.Live

 

1991 births
Living people
American male boxers
American boxers of Mexican descent
Boxers from Nevada
Winners of the United States Championship for amateur boxers
National Golden Gloves champions
Super-bantamweight boxers
World super-bantamweight boxing champions
World Boxing Organization champions